For most of its 1,200 year history, Bremen was an independent city within the confederal jurisdiction of Germany's Holy Roman Empire. In the late Middle Ages, its governing merchant guilds were at the centre of the Hanseatic League that sought to monopolise North Sea and Baltic trade. To enlarge and confirm its independence, the city had to contend until the Reformation with the Prince-Archbishop of Bremen, and after the Thirty Years War with the Swedes, masters of the surrounding, former episcopal, duchies.

In the late nineteenth century Bremen was drawn by Prussia into the German Empire. With new sea wharves and anchorage at Bremerhaven, it became Germany's principal port of emigration to the Americas, and an entrepôt for her late developing colonial trade. The Norddeutscher Lloyd (NDL), founded in Bremen in 1857, developed as one of the world's leading shipping companies.

In the twentieth century, Bremen, a broadly liberal and social-democratic city, lost its autonomy under the Hitler regime. After World War Two, in which two thirds of the city's fabric was severely damaged, this was restored. Bremen became one of the founding Länder (or states) of the German Federal Republic. From the late 1950s, the post-war Wirtschaftswunder drew workers to the city from Turkey and southern Europe, so that, combined with refugees resettled in the 21st century, close to a third of Bremen's population today is of recent non-German origin.

Early history
The marshes and moraines near Bremen have been settled since about 12,000 BC. Burial places and settlements in Bremen-Mahndorf and Bremen-Osterholz date back to the 7th century AD. Since the Renaissance, chroniclers have assumed that Fabiranum or Phabiranon on Ptolemy's  Fourth Map of Europe (dating from AD 150) refers to Bremen. However, Ptolemy's coordinates suggest a site northeast of the mouth of the river Visurgis (Weser). In Ptolemy's time the Chauci lived in the area now called north-western Germany or Lower Saxony. By the end of the 3rd century, they had merged with the Saxons.

During the Saxon Wars (772–804),  Widukind led a prolonged resistance to the western advance of Franks. The Frankish king Charlemagne ultimately prevailed: thousands Saxon nobles were massacred, and conversion to Christianity was ordered by decree. In 787 Willehad of Bremen became the first Bishop of Bremen. In 888, at the behest of Archbishop Rimbert, Kaiser Arnulf of Carinthia, the Carolingian King of East Francia, granted Bremen the rights (confirmed in 965) to hold its own markets, mint its own coins and make its own customs laws.

The city's first stone walls were built in 1032, and the stone cathedral of St Peter's followed in 1042. These were marks of the wealth beginning to accumulate from North Sea trade. In the century that followed, Dutch settlers began to drain the surrounding wetlands and to build the dikes that are still a characteristic of Bremen's environs.

In 1186 the Prince-Archbishop Hartwig of Uthlede and his bailiff in Bremen confirmed the Gelnhausen Privilege, by which Frederick I Barbarossa granted the city considerable legislative and fiscal autonomy. Property within the municipal boundaries was freed from feudal imposts; this included serfs. If resident in the city for at least a year and a day, they were to be regarded as free persons. The foundation for Bremen's claim to its later status as a Free Imperial City, the privilege was confirmed and enlarged in 1233 by Archbishop Gerhard II in return for assistance in the Stedinger Crusade, his suppression of an insurrectionary peasant republic.

The city's remaining tax obligations to the Prince-Archbishop were both a burden and a lever of influence. The city participated in the Diet or Landtag of Archbishopric of Bremen where holding the "power of the purse" as the principal taxpayer it could extract further concessions.

Hanseatic League
In 1260 Bremen joined the Hanseatic League. A trade cartel of northern European towns, it was centred upon Lübeck, a base for merchants from Saxony and Westphalia trading in the eastern Baltic. This was a source timber, wax, amber, resins, and furs, along with rye and wheat brought down on barges from the hinterland to port markets. Of equal importance to the powerful merchant guilds or Hansa of Bremen was the ability of the League to control of the North Sea salt-fish trade, especially the Scania Market.

Bremen was engaged in numerous military actions of the League to maintain and enhance their collective privileges. In the 1440s it was also to engage, on its own initiative, privateers to attack the League's rivals in the North Sea. One notorious captain, known as Grote Gherd ("Great Gerry"), captured 13 ships from Flanders in a single expedition.

Trade secured by the League brought both commerce and industry to Bremen and the surrounding region. Newer and finer woollen and linen fabrics, and even silks, were manufactured. The same artisanal refinement of the products of cottage industry occurred in other fields, e.g. etching, wood carving, armour production, engraving of metals, and wood-turning. Trade also increased exchanges with Italy and the Mediterranean, and ensuring the early arrival of the Renaissance in northern Germany. A legacy of the period in a regional style of architecture known the Weser Renaissance, typified by the embellished facade added to the Bremen Rathaus in 1612.

Much of the drive for this co-operation between otherwise rival cities had come from the fragmented nature of existing territorial governments, which failed to provide security for trade. But as princely authority consolidated in the 16th century, creating powerful monarchies--Sweden, Denmark-Norway, Brandenburg-Prussia, England—and as the United Dutch Provinces entered the competition, the League's importance for Bremen declined. The last of the League's great trading posts (or Kontors), in Bergen, closed in 1754.

Struggle with the Prince Archbishop 

In 1350, Bremen was a city of 20,000, its trade carried by the Hansekogge (cog ship), a unique product of its shipbuilders. But conflict with the Prince Archbishop and other magnates in the surrounding country continued. In 1365, new taxes levied to ransom burghers held hostages by Gerhard III, Count of Hoya, triggered a popular uprising in the town that was only put down by the city council after much bloodshed.

Reacting to the Prince Archbishop's efforts to exploit its internal strife, the city enhanced its fortifications. An extra narrow gate, the so-called Bishop's Needle (first mentioned in 1274), was reserved for all clergy, including the Prince-Archbishop. The narrowness of the gate made it physically impossible for him to enter surrounded by his knights. Factionalism nonetheless permitted Albert II of Brunswick-Wolfenbüttel, the Prince-Archbishop, to seize the city the night of 29 May 1366. But within a month, exiles, with assistance of the Count of Oldenburg, recovered city and executed the collaborators.

From  the end of the 1360s, Albert's growing indebtedness placed Bremen in the position of being able not only to effectively buy out his rights in the city, but also to purchase many his surrounding fortresses and bailiwicks.

 In 1381 the city's troops successfully ended the brigandage by other impecunious landed magnates and knights by itself becoming their liege lord, and thereby extending its control along the lower course of the Weser. As a measure of its new power and independence, in 1404 the city replaced the old wooden statue of Roland, with the larger limestone model which, surviving six centuries, stands today before the Rathaus in the central market place.

By 1421 Bremen reached its greatest extent, after the Duchy of Saxe-Lauenburg and stricken Knights of Bederkesa pawned lands on both sides of the lower Weser.

The Reformation 

Bremen, long hostile in its conflict with the Prince-Archbishop to the temporal power and pretensions of the Church, readily embraced the Protestant Reformation that swept northern Germany from the late 1520s. In 1532, Bremen's burghers forcefully interrupted Catholic Mass in St Peter's cathedral, the Bremer Dom, and prompted a pastor to hold a Lutheran service. The Prince-Archbishop who, as the last of his rights within the city, retained sovereign control of the Cathedral shut its doors. But he was unable even within the communities under his direct authority to stem the tide of conversion to the Reformed faith/Calvinism.

In 1547 the chapter, meanwhile prevailingly Lutheran, appointed the Dutch Albert Hardenberg, called Rizaeus, as the Cathedral's first Cathedral Protestant pastor. Rizaeus, however, turned out to be of Zwinglian persuasion so that – after heated disputes – in 1561, the cathedral again closed its doors, not to be open again for services until 1638.

In the 1590s the majority of Bremen's burghers and city council adopted Calvinism in opposition to the cathedral chapter which remained beholden to the now Lutheran administration of the Prince-Archbishopric. This antagonism between a Calvinistic majority and the Lutheran minority that was to retain control of the Cathedral until 1803 (when finally it was first mediatised as part of the city), continued into the 19th century. It was not resolved until 1873 when the Calvinist and Lutheran congregations of Bremen reconciled under the administrative umbrella of the Bremen Protestant Church.

Thirty Years' War 
Soon after the beginning of the Thirty Years' War Bremen declared its neutrality. In 1623 it refused the appeal of the Republic of the Seven United Netherlands to assist it what proved to be an Eighty Years' War for its independence against Habsburg Spanish and imperial forces. Imperial forces under Albrecht von Wallenstein and those of the Catholic League nonetheless headed north. Wallenstein had visions of breaking-up Hanseatic League, and of establishing new Baltic trade monopolies for the benefit of imperial favourites. In 1628, Bremen paid Wallenstein a hefty ransom to spare itself a siege, and by such means was able, throughout the war, to avoid occupation.

In 1629 an imperial Edict of Restitution ordered Bremen to restore to the again Catholic Prince Archbishop its properties and rights within the city, including control of the Cathedral. The city refused, suggesting it rather separate from the Holy Roman Empire and join the Dutch in their Republic. The intervention of the Lutheran Swedes under Gustavus Adolphus saved the city from the consequences of its defiance. But Swedish control of the former episcopal territories surrounding the city confirmed by the Treaty Westphalia in 1648, Bremen sensed a new threat to its independence

Bremen had appealed for an imperial confirmation of its imperial immediacy, which it argued had been implicit in the Gelnhausen Privilege of 1186. In 1646 Ferdinand III, Holy Roman Emperor, granted the request in the Diploma of Linz, recognising Bremen as a Free Imperial City.

Swedish wars 

Sweden would not accept that its new imperial fief of Bremen-Verden excluded the city. In 1653, its troops captured Bremerlehe, Bremen again appealed to Ferdinand III, Holy Roman Emperor. In February 1654 the emperor for the first time granted Bremen a seat and a vote in the Imperial Diet, and demanded of Christina of Sweden that she return Bremerlehe and compensate the city. But further fighting ensued, and Bremen was induced to pay tribute and levy taxes in favour of Swedish Bremen-Verden and to cede territory around Bederkesa and Bremerlehe.

In 1664, after Bremen was again seated in an Imperial Diet, the Swedes under Carl Gustaf Wrangel laid siege. In the Treaty of Habenhausen (1666) their ambitions were decisively checked by a coalition rival powers: Brandenburg-Prussia, Denmark, and the Netherlands.

In 1712, in the course of the Great Northern War (1700–1721) against the Swedish supremacy in the Baltic, plague stricken Bremen-Verden was occupied by Frederick IV of Denmark.  In 1715 he surrendered it to a new ally, George I, King of Great Britain since 1714, and Elector of Hanover. Surrounded by Hanover, which remained in personal union with Britain, Bremen was effectively sheltered from the subsequent wars of the eighteenth century.

19th century 

In 1813, following their defeat at the Battle of Leipzig, the French withdrew . Johann Smidt, Bremen's representative at the Congress of Vienna, was successful in achieving the "non-mediatisation" of Bremen, Hamburg and Lübeck. Rather than being integrated into neighbouring monarchies, the fate of many smaller territories, they were restored to their ancient autonomy as republics within the new German Confederation (Deutscher Bund).

After Prussia defeated Austria in 1866 and annexed Hannover, Bremen joined Berlin in North German Confederation. With the German victory over France in 1871, this Confederation was enlarged under broadly the same Prussian-dominated constitution as the German Empire.

Meanwhile Bremen was developing as an industrial port. The first German steamship was manufactured in 1817 in the shipyard of Johann Lange. But further development of the port, which was 37 kilometers upstream from the sea, was limited by the persistent of silting of the Weser. In 1827, Bremen Mayor Smidt succeeded in purchasing a strip of land from the Kingdom of Hanover at the mouth of the Weser with open access to the sea, to establish Bremerhaven.

Together with the rapidly growing railroad connections, the development of new sea port ensured that Bremen retained its leadership over Hamburg as Germany's principal port of embarkation for emigrants travelling to the Americas not only from southern and eastern Germany, but also, beginning in the 1880s, in even greater numbers from Central and Eastern Europe. It also positioned Bremen to serve as Germany's entrepôt for the colonial trade, importing and processing coffee, tobacco, cotton and rice. This grew as Germany, from 1884, began to acquire her own African and South Sea possessions.

Colonial expansion, and an accompanying programme of naval construction, was strongly supported by merchant interests in Bremen, organised in the Kolonialverein (Colonial Union). That Bremen remains "Germany's coffee capital" (with well-known brands and roasteries such as Jacobs, Azul or HAG) is a legacy of the period. Another, although not completed until 1931, is a ten-metre brick figure of elephant, designed by Fritz Behn. For decades the Reichskolonialehrendenkmal stood as a symbol of German colonial ambition and nostalgia. (Today it has been repurposed as "Bremen anti colonial monument" and with a memorial to the victims of the German genocide in what today is Namibia placed beside it).

The combination of mass trans-Atlantic emigration and the colonial trade spurred the growth in Bremen of major international shipping companies. The greatest of these (now a part of Hapag-Lloyd) was Norddeutscher Lloyd (NDL) founded in 1857.

20th century

Left-liberal city

As an international port and industrial centre Bremen had a strong liberal and left tradition. In the last elections to the Imperial Reichstag, in January 1912, the Social Democrats (SPD) secured over half the vote, 53.4%. Left Liberals (Linksliberale) took another 41.4%. Just 5.1% went to the Conservatives.

Following the defeat in World War I, and in the relative chaos induced by naval and army mutinies and by the hardships of a prolonged British blockade, Bremen was briefly governed by a revolutionary workers and soldiers council.

After two months, on January 10, 1919, the Independent Social Democrats on the council, joined with the fledgling communist party, the Spartacus League, in declaring Bremen a Soviet (or Council) Republic in defiance of the SPD-led regime in Berlin. Within three weeks it was crushed by the right-wing military Freikorps. Despite the reverse of revolutionary hopes, and continuing division, the left maintained a strong presence in Bremen.

In the last broadly free election of the Weimar Republic, in November 1932, the Social Democrats won 31.2% of the vote in Bremen, while the Communists (KPD) received 16.8%. The Nazis polled 20.8%, 50% below their result nationally.

Under the Hitler regime
After the Reichstag Fire Decree of 27 February 1933, the new Hitler regime began arresting and forcing into hiding, members of the Communist Party and the Social Democratic Party. Violence broke out in Bremen on the day before the Reichstag election of 5 March 1933 and 40 persons were arrested. That same day, the Nazi Party Kreisleiter for Bremen, called for a reorganization of the Senate and the dissolution of the Bürgerschaft. In that heavily compromised national election, the Nazis still achieved only 32.7% of the popular vote in Bremen, far below their 44% nationally.

The next day, a large crowd led by Nazi brownshirts gathered in the market square in the morning, chanting for the resignation of the Senate and hanging swastika flags on the facade of the city hall. The Police President declined to  intervene, and hundreds of people gathered again in the afternoon. A Nazi delegation, led by Gauleiter Karl Röver and Kreisleiter Bernhard, entered the city hall and confronted the Senate with the Nazi demands, including that administration of the police should be placed in the hands of the Nazi Party. The Senate did not accede to these demands but agreed to hoist the former imperial flag. As a result, the three Social Democratic members of the Senate resigned. However, since the Senate refused the other demands, that evening the Reich Interior Minister Wilhelm Frick intervened and appointed  as the Reichskommissar in charge of the Bremen police. Shortly afterward, the remaining members of the Senate agreed that they would disband, effectively leaving Bremen under the control of the Nazis. After the formal resignation of the Senate on 16 March, the Bürgerschaft elected Markert Senate President and acting Bürgermeister on 18 March. 

On 31 March 1933, the Nazi government enacted the Provisional Law on the Coordination of the States with the Reich, which mandated the reconstitution of the Bürgerschaft on the basis of the recent Reichstag election. When the Communist Party deputies were excluded in accordance with § 4 of the law, it gave the Nazis and their ally, the German National People's Party (DNVP), a majority in the Bürgerschaft. However, on 14 October 1933 it was dissolved, together with all other state parliaments, and no new elections were scheduled. On 30 January 1934, the Reichstag enacted the Law on the Reconstruction of the Reich, which mandated the assumption of state sovereignty by the Reich and the abolition of all state parliaments. Thus the Bremen Bürgerschaft, which had existed since 1849, was eliminated altogether. Bremen remained under the direct authority of Gauleiter Röver, who on 5 May 1933 had been appointed Reichsstatthalter (Reich Governor) for both Bremen and the Free State of Oldenburg, with his headquarters in Oldenburg. Bremen, though technically remaining a German state, effectively became only an administrative unit of the Reich.

1,438 people were registered as members of the Jewish community in Bremen at the beginning of 1933  (0.2% of the city's population). Of these, about 930 had managed to leave Germany by 1941. Those remaining suffered the same fate as those elsewhere in Germany: deportation and murder in the concentration camps of occupied Poland. Bremen-Farge concentration camp, a sub-camp of the Neuengamme camp complex, was established in the autumn of 1943. The prisoners were used as slave labour at the U-boot Bunker Valentin.

In the war-plan economy of the new regime, Bremen was a centre not only of naval, and particularly submarine (U-boot), construction, but also of aircraft production. Henrich Focke, Georg Wulf and Werner Naumann had founded Focke-Wulf Flugzeugbau AG in Bremen in 1923 (the aviation company that, beginning in 1964, entered a series of mergers that incorporates it into today's Airbus). Borgward, an automobile manufacturer, was founded in 1929 (today part of Daimler AG) was also developed as a military contractor. War production employed foreign slave labour on an increasingly large scale.

The villages of Grohn, Schönebeck, Aumund, Hammersbeck, Fähr, Lobbendorf, Blumenthal, Farge and  became part of the city of Bremen in 1939.

Allied bombing destroyed the majority of the historical Hanseatic city as well as 60% of its housing stock during World War II. The British 3rd Infantry Division under General Lashmer Whistler captured Bremen after heavy shelling in late April 1945. The British handed over to the Americans; Bremen became an American-controlled port for the supply of the US zones of occupation in west Berlin and the south of Germany.

Post-War reconstruction
On 1 August 1945, the US military government appointed Wilhelm Kaisen (SPD) (prior to 1933 Senator for social services) mayor of Bremen, a position to which he was then elected repeatedly until his retirement in 1965. With the support initially of the Communists as well as Liberals, Kaisen worked to re-establish the pre-Hitler democratic order. To prevent Bremen's incorporation into the state of Lower Saxony then being formed in the surrounding British zone of occupation, in 1946 he successfully took the case for Bremen's traditional independence to the United States.

Bremen's signature Renaissance-fronted gothic Town Hall (Rathaus), the statue of Roland (1404) (symbol of the city's independence) standing before it in the central market place, and the 11th-century cathedral (Bremer Dom) survived Allied bombing. Limited efforts were made to restore other damaged elements of the old city, but the priority in reconstruction was housing for a population swollen by German refugees from eastern territories annexed by Poland and the Soviet Union, and the restoration of industrial production and transport.

Bremen's economy boomed in line with the West German Wirtschaftswunder of the 1950s and 60s. This saw the growth, and permanent settlement, of a large migrant worker population, drawn largely from Turkey and southern Europe.

After the Wirtschaftswunder
Some of the city's heavier industries failed to recover from the oil-price-shock recession of the early 1970s and from the growth of industrial output in east Asia. Specialist construction yards, ship outfitters and parts suppliers remain, but AG Weser (which employed 16,000 workers at its peak) and Bremer Vulcan, Bremen's major shipbuilders, closed in 1983 and 1997 respectively. Further job losses were caused by the restructuring and increasing mechanisation of harbour-related activities and other industrial sectors. Semi and unskilled harbour workers found it very difficult to re-enter the labour market, and unemployment—for a period in the 1980s almost double the West German average—remained comparatively high.

At a time when these changes in the economy were forcing the Senate to spend more on social services. suburbanisation was reducing Bremen's population and tax revenue. Incorporating surrounding suburban municipalities, was not an option for Bremen as these belonged to the state of Lower Saxony.

Following the 1991 elections, the SPD, while remaining the strongest political party, was obliged to form coalitions and therefore to make political compromises. The first coalition was established with the smaller liberal Free Democratic Party (FDP) and the Green Party. It became clear to city leaders that the process of decline could be slowed down through public subsidies protecting less competitive industries but could not be stopped, even less reversed. The idea of cutting subsidies and reorienting economic policy was particularly difficult for the Social Democrats given their strong traditional links to manual workers and trade unions.

Eventually, and with offers of financial assistance from the European Union, a consensus developed on the need to support established economic sectors based on advanced technological developments, such as aerospace and aircraft production, automobile production, maritime and logistics services, and to develop education and business-park infrastructure for the emergence of new science-based and digital enterprises. In this the University of Bremen, founded in 1971, has been accorded a key role. It is one of 11 institutions classed as an "Elite university" in Germany, and teaches approximately 23,500 people from 126 countries. Further investment went into the revitalisation of the city centre but a culture-driven regeneration around entertainment and tourism was not very successful. Several experts described Bremen’s service sector as underdeveloped, due to a lack of major company headquarters.

At the turn of the new century, unemployment In Bremen stood at 14%, a rate matched in the Federal Republic only by the "new states" in former East Germany.

The new immigrant city
As an international port and industrial centre, Bremen has always drawn people from abroad. In recent decades, the changing economy and international events have contributed to a rapidly changing population mix.

As of 2020, close of a third of the city population were of recent non-German origin. People of Turkish origin (first, second and third generation) remain the largest non-German ethnicity (there are 23,000 Turkish-born residents) but as a result of refugee resettlement since 2015 they are now closely followed by Syrians (18,000), and by people form central and eastern Europe, notably from Poland, Bulgaria and Romania.

Hegemony of the SPD 
Save for 1918-22, when briefly they split, the Social Democrats have been the leading party in every free election in Bremen since 1912. They have formed, either singularly (1971-1991) or in coalition, every administration since 1945. Since 2007 they have governed with the Greens, a coalition joined in 2019 by the Left (die Linke), the SPD having won their lowest share of the popular vote, 24.9%, since the war. There was a recovery in the 2021 Federal elections, with Social Democrats in Bremen taking a third of the vote.

See also
Timeline of Bremen

References

Bremen